Isla Pata, the paw or foot, is an island in the Gulf of California, located within Bahía de los Angeles off the coast of the Baja California Peninsula. The island is uninhabited and is part of the Ensenada Municipality.

Biology
Isla Pata has only one species of  reptile, the Common Side-blotched Lizard (Uta stansburiana).

References

http://herpatlas.sdnhm.org/places/overview/isla-pata/95/1/

Islands of Baja California
Islands of the Gulf of California
Islands of Ensenada Municipality
Uninhabited islands of Mexico